The men's individual Peruvian fronton basque pelota event at the 2019 Pan American Games was held from 4–10 August at the Basque pelota courts in the Villa María del Triunfo Sports Center in Lima, Peru. Cristopher Martínez won the gold medal, after defeating Guillermo Osorio in the final.

Results

Preliminary round
The preliminary stage consisted of 5 competitors where everybody played each other once. At the end of this stage, the top 4 competitors advanced to the medal round.

All times are local (UTC-5)

Bronze medal match

Gold medal match

References

Men's individual Peruvian fronton